Karvansara-ye Sofla (also Romanized as Kārvānsarā-ye Soflá; also known as Kārvānsarā, Kāravānsarā, and Kāravānsarā-ye Bālā) is a village in Beyranvand-e Shomali Rural District, Bayravand District, Khorramabad County, Lorestan Province, Iran. At the 2006 census, its population was 40, in 9 families.

References 

Towns and villages in Khorramabad County